Hamadaea flava is a Gram-positive, aerobic and non-motile bacterium from the genus Hamadaea which has been isolated from soil from a tobacco farm from Yunnan, China.

References 

Micromonosporaceae
Bacteria described in 2016